Lepetella postapicula is a species of sea snail, a marine gastropod mollusk in the family Lepetellidae.

Distribution
This marine species occurs in the Ross Sea, Antarctica, at a depth of 1890 m.

References

 Engl W. (2012) Shells of Antarctica. Hackenheim: Conchbooks. 402 pp

External links
 Antarctic Invertebrates: Lepetella postapicula

Lepetellidae
Gastropods described in 1990